Zone 3 is a zone of the municipality of Ad Dawhah in the state of Qatar. The main districts recorded in the 2015 population census were Fereej Mohammed Bin Jasim and Mushayrib.

References 

Zones of Qatar
Doha